In mathematics, the Besicovitch inequality is a geometric inequality relating volume of a set and distances between certain subsets of its boundary. The inequality was first formulated by Abram Besicovitch.

Consider the n-dimensional cube  with a Riemannian metric . Let 

denote the distance between opposite faces of the cube. The Besicovitch inequality asserts that 

The inequality can be generalized in the following way. Given an n-dimensional Riemannian manifold M with connected boundary and a smooth map , such that the restriction of f to the boundary of M is a degree 1 map onto , define 
 
Then .

The Besicovitch inequality was used to prove systolic inequalities
on surfaces.

Notes

References
 Burago, Dmitri & Burago, Yuri & Ivanov, Sergei. (2001). A Course in Metric Geometry. Graduate Studies in Mathematics 33. 
 Burago Yu. & Zalgaller, V. A. Geometric inequalities. Grundlehren der Mathematischen Wissenschaften [Fundamental Principles of Mathematical Sciences], 285. Springer Series in Soviet Mathematics. Springer-Verlag, Berlin, 1988.
 Misha Gromov. Metric structures for Riemannian and non-Riemannian spaces. Based on the 1981 French original. With appendices by M. Katz, P. Pansu and S. Semmes. Translated from the French by Sean Michael Bates. Progress in Mathematics, 152. Birkhäuser Boston, Inc., Boston, MA, 1999. xx+585 pp. .
 Burago, D., & Ivanov, S. (2002). On Asymptotic Volume of Finsler Tori, Minimal Surfaces in Normed Spaces, and Symplectic Filling Volume. Annals of Mathematics, 156(3), second series, 891-914. doi:10.2307/3597285

Geometric inequalities